Floyd Mayweather Jr. vs. Carlos Baldomir, billed as Pretty Risky, was a boxing match for the WBC and The Ring welterweight titles. The bout was held on November 4, 2006, at the Mandalay Bay Resort and Casino in Las Vegas, Nevada. The event also featured Robert Guerrero vs. Orlando Salido for the IBF featherweight title. Floyd Mayweather won this bout by a unanimous decision.

Background

Prior to the bout, Mayweather held the IBF welterweight title. Mayweather was slated to fight the WBO welterweight champion Antonio Margarito in a unification fight but turned down the prospective fight as he and then-promoter, Bob Arum, disagreed on the prize purse. This led to Mayweather buying out his contract under Top Rank.

Mayweather expressed a desire to fight then-WBC super welterweight champion Oscar De La Hoya and so Mayweather relinquished his IBF welterweight title in anticipation of the mega bout. Subsequently, the vacant IBF welterweight title was won by Kermit Cintron.

However, the fight would not materialize until after May 5 of the following year, thus Mayweather opted to fight Carlos Baldomir for his WBC and The Ring welterweight titles.

Fight earnings

325,000 pay-per-view buys, $16.3 million in television revenue.

References

Baldomir
2006 in boxing
Boxing in Las Vegas
2006 in sports in Nevada
Boxing on HBO
November 2006 sports events in the United States